José Torres (born 16 July 1889, date of death unknown) was a Chilean road bicycle racing cyclist. He competed in both events, Time Trial and Team Time Trial, at the 1912 Summer Olympics.

References

1889 births
Year of death missing
Chilean male cyclists
Olympic cyclists of Chile
Cyclists at the 1912 Summer Olympics